Zheng Xingjuan (born March 20, 1989, in Fuqing, Fujian, PR China) is a Chinese high jumper.

Career
She started her international career at the 2005 World Championships without reaching the final. In 2006, she won the silver medal at the World Junior Championships and the bronze medal at the Asian Games.

She won the high jump event at the 2009 Asian Athletics Championships in Guangzhou and again at the 2011 event in Kobe. Further she ended 5th at the 2010 World Indoor Championships in Doha and 6th at the 2011 World Championships in Athletics in Daegu (5th after competitor disqualification).

Progression
She had some progression in her personal best over the last seasons. Her outdoor best is 1.95 m which she crossed first in 2009 in Jinan and again in 2011 at the Daegu world championships. Indoors she has jumped 1.94 m at the world championships in Doha. The Chinese record is currently held by Jin Ling with 1.97 metres.

Achievements

References

1989 births
Living people
Chinese female high jumpers
Athletes (track and field) at the 2008 Summer Olympics
Olympic athletes of China
Asian Games medalists in athletics (track and field)
Athletes (track and field) at the 2012 Summer Olympics
Athletes from Fujian
Sportspeople from Fuzhou
Athletes (track and field) at the 2006 Asian Games
Athletes (track and field) at the 2010 Asian Games
Athletes (track and field) at the 2014 Asian Games
World Athletics Championships athletes for China
Asian Games silver medalists for China
Asian Games bronze medalists for China
Medalists at the 2006 Asian Games
Medalists at the 2010 Asian Games
Medalists at the 2014 Asian Games
21st-century Chinese women